Dame Valerie Adams: More than Gold is a 2022 New Zealand documentary film, focusing on the life of Tongan-New Zealand Olympic shot putter Valerie Adams.

Synopsis

The film follow's Adams' life through her upbringing in Tonga and South Auckland and her professional sporting career, and follows Adams as she prepared for her fifth Olympic games appearance at the 2020 Summer Olympics. The film also addresses issues Adams faced in her life and sporting career, including childhood bullying, losing her mother at 15, racism, in vitro fertilisation, and recovery from surgery.

Production 

The film was directed by Briar March, and was produced by Leanne Pooley. The film is a mix of archival footage, interviews and animation, including interview footage with Adams' younger brother Steven Adams and her former coach Kirsten Hellier.

Release 

The film debuted on 12 October 2022 at SkyCity Auckland, and received a wide release in New Zealand cinemas on 20 October. As of November 2022, it is the fourth highest grossing film of New Zealand origin at the New Zealand box office for 2022.

References

External links
 

2022 films
2022 documentary films
2020s New Zealand films
Documentary films about sportspeople
Documentary films about women's sports
New Zealand documentary films
Films set in New Zealand
Films shot in New Zealand
Shot put
2020 Summer Olympics
Films about the Summer Olympics